Alex Witt (born March 21, 1976) is an American former professional tennis player.

Witt was a collegiate tennis player for Northwestern University in the mid-1990s and accumulated 107 career singles wins. He was named Big Ten Player of the Year in 1997 and turned professional after graduating the following year.

As a professional player he featured mainly on the ITF Futures and ATP Challenger circuits. In 2000 he qualified for his first and only ATP Tour main draw at the Stella Artois Championships (Queen's Club), where he lost his first round match to Jens Knippschild in three sets.

ITF Futures titles

Doubles: (1)

References

External links
 
 

1976 births
Living people
American male tennis players
Northwestern Wildcats men's tennis players